The Lynchburg Hornets refer to the 24 varsity intercollegiate athletic programs that represent the University of Lynchburg, located in Lynchburg, Virginia. On July 1, 2018, the institution's name changed from Lynchburg College to the University of Lynchburg. Lynchburg's intercollegiate athletic programs compete primarily in NCAA Division III, though its equestrian teams compete in Intercollegiate Horse Shows of America and National Collegiate Equestrian Association competition formats.

The Hornets compete as a full member of the Old Dominion Athletic Conference (ODAC). Lynchburg was a founding member of the league in 1976. In that time, the Hornets have won 205 ODAC championships.

Roughly 500 student-athletes represent Lynchburg in competition, meaning about 25 percent of the institution's student body competes in varsity athletics.

Varsity teams

List of teams

Men's sports
 Baseball
 Basketball
 Cross Country
 Golf
 Indoor Track & Field
 Lacrosse
 Outdoor Track & Field
 Soccer
 Swimming
 Tennis

Women's sports
 Basketball
 Beach Volleyball
 Cross Country
 Field Hockey
 Golf
 Indoor Track & Field
 Lacrosse
 Outdoor Track & Field
 Soccer
 Softball
 Swimming
 Tennis
 Volleyball

Co-ed sports
 Equestrian

National championships

Team

References

External links